Mount Roskill Grammar School is a secondary school in the suburb of Mount Roskill, Auckland. Officially opened in 1953, the school is widely regarded as one of the most diverse schools in Auckland, having students of over 70 different nationalities including approximately 120 International students. The school has been noted by media for its rising academic success and exceptional performance for its low socio-economic decile.

History

The school opened in 1953, on a plot of land the Auckland Education Board purchased from the Auckland Rugby Union. It was one of the first new secondary schools in central Auckland in eight years, and was opened when Mount Roskill was a semi-rural but rapidly developing suburb. The school began with a roll of 363, but by 1964 the school had expanded to over 1,300 students, making it the largest in the country. When the school was first established, the grounds were rocky and uneven. In 1956, school students helped dig the school pool by hand.

In 1957 the school was granted its own board of governors and adopted the emblem of the Phoenix with the motto 'Sursum' meaning 'To the Heights'. The Phoenix was chosen for its symbolism of the pursuit of excellence and periodic renewal and revitalization.

The Maclean Centre for disabled students was opened in 1977, named in honour of Mr B H Maclean, Principal from 1966 to 1981. The Centre moved into a new building in 2003 and the staff and students are fully involved in all areas of school life.

In 1989, Colin Prentice, former head boy of Mount Roskil Grammar, became the school's principal.

In 2018, Mount Roskill adopted a completely gender-neutral uniform for its students.

Enrolment
The school is widely known as one of the most diverse in New Zealand. The school roll has an ethnic composition of 26% Indian, 16% Chinese, 13% Pākehā, 11% Tongan, 8% Samoan, 6% Māori, 3% South East Asian, 3% African, 2% Cook Island Māori, and 12% other.

Premises
The school has had several structural improvements, such as the construction of new buildings such as the Science Block, the Maclean Centre, T-Block, renovation of H-Block (including the Year 13 Common Room - a room with lockers, kitchen appliances, and recreation features dedicated to final year students), and the new gymnasium and classrooms. At the end of 2009, a new Pastoral Care Centre was built and opened in 2010. Rebuilding of the school's C-Block finished late 2010. In 2016, the new Olympic-grade hockey turf was completed.

Academics
The school has a very proud academic record, with top scholarship results comparable to other higher-decile schools in Auckland, despite the fact that it is a decile 4 school. Mount Roskill Grammar School has been described by the New Zealand Herald in 2007 as the "best public school in New Zealand". In 2009 Metro Magazine has also ranked MRGS as the top school in Auckland, saying "Mt Roskill is not uniquely gifted; it has to work hard to get the results it does. But it was in the top 10 for every indicator we looked at, and usually, it was first or second. In general, its academic results were what you would expect of a decile-9 school.".

The school has 10 computer labs catering for students from Year 9-13.  Mount Roskill Grammar operates under a strict contract, which every student signs, so that these technologies are not abused. Mount Roskill Grammar is also one of the schools participating in the Phase 2 of the Beacon Practice from  GIF Technology Education initiative.

In 2013, 90.7 percent of students leaving Mount Roskill Grammar held at least NCEA Level 1, 82.5 percent held at least NCEA Level 2, and 58.3 percent held at least University Entrance. This is compared to 85.2%, 74.2%, and 49.0% respectively for all students nationally.

Principals

Extracurricular activities
Mount Roskill Grammar School offers sports, music and other extracurricular activities. Notably there are culture groups in Indian, Chinese, Japanese, Kapa haka, Tongan, Samoan, Tokelauan, Niuean and Cook Islands culture. The Indian Dance group won the 2007 Annual Bollywood Highschool Dance Competition.

The Boys Chorus (Mr G's Boys Chorus) was actively involved in Barbershop Music, winning a record of 5 consecutive Auckland Regional titles in 2002, 2003, 2004, 2005, and 2006 as well as the New Zealand National Young Singers in Harmony Championships in 2002, 2005 and 2006. The school at that time was the only school in New Zealand to have won 3 National Championships, and 2 consecutively.

Houses
As of 2017, Mount Roskill Grammar School has 5 houses that have been named after famous New Zealanders - Rutherford (Red), Ngata (Orange), Sheppard (Yellow), Hillary (Green) And Cooper (Blue).  Junior students are placed into house groups through their core classes, senior students remain in the houses they were in during year 10.

Awards
Goodman Fielder School of the Year Award, for Outstanding Performance in Education in 1998.
Goodman Fielder Secondary School of the Year Award, in 2002, and finalist in the Secondary School section in 1999 and 2001.

In 2017 the school was twice the winner of the High School League Premier Division Championships.

Alumni

Gretchen Albrecht, artist
Russell Crowe, Actor, Academy Award- and Golden Globe-winner
Alannah Currie, Thompson Twins member
Abby Erceg, former New Zealand Football Ferns captain, captain of the North Carolina Courage in the NWSL
Owen Glenn, Businessman
Graeme Hart, New Zealand's Richest Man
John Hart, former All Blacks coach
Latha Hegde, Bollywood Actress
Harry McNaughton, Shortland Street Actor
Tarun Nethula, New Zealand national cricket team (Blackcaps) member
Clinton Randell, New Zealand Idol Reality Show Contestant
Nalini Singh, New York Times bestselling author
Brett Steven, Tennis Player
Evarn Tuimavave, New Zealand Warriors player

Controversy
In 1995 the school adopted a peer-mediated programme called "Cool Schools" and with support from Peace Foundation had trained 200 of 2100 students to be mediators in Years 11 through 12. This programme is now the largest student mediation programme in New Zealand.

In March 2010, Mt Roskill Grammar School appeared on the TV3 Consumer Rights program "Target" regarding the introduction of their new uniform and the three-year phase-in time, a costly introduction to parents of existing students. It was met with opposition by the student body but Greg Watson, the principal, pleaded ignorance to the issue and has stated that he had received positive support regarding it. Watson has not informed the school if a change will be made to the way the new school uniform will be introduced.

On 16 March 2011, Campbell Live, a TV3 current affairs programme aired an interview on bullying at Mount Roskill Grammar where a member of the study body had been bullied to a point that she spent "12 lessons in the Dean's office or the administration area across a 7-day period". The school since resolved the matter.

In 2010s the school scrubbed its girls' rugby team due to fighting but brought it under control by 2015.

References

Related links
Official site

Educational institutions established in 1953
Secondary schools in Auckland
1953 establishments in New Zealand